Industrial Training Institute, Tollygunge , (also known as ITI Tollygunge), established in 1957,  is one of the oldest government vocational training institute located in Tollygunge, Kolkata,  West Bengal. ITI Tollygunge offers different training courses on Carpenter, Electrician, Fitter, Foundryman, Machinist, Turner, Welder, Wireman, Sheet Metal Worker, Draughtsman (Mechanical), Draughtsman (Civil).

References

Educational institutions established in 1957
1958 establishments in West Bengal
Industrial Training Institute (ITI) in West Bengal 

https://www.itiofindia.com/iti-tollygunge/